Axel Berndt is a German sprint canoer who competed in the early 1990s. He won a bronze medal in the C-4 500 m event at the 1991 ICF Canoe Sprint World Championships in Paris.

References

German male canoeists
Living people
Year of birth missing (living people)
ICF Canoe Sprint World Championships medalists in Canadian